The “holy trinity” in Cajun cuisine and Louisiana Creole cuisine is the base for several dishes in the regional cuisines of Louisiana and consists of onions, bell peppers and celery. The preparation of Cajun/Creole dishes such as crawfish étouffée, gumbo, and jambalaya all start from this base.

Variants use garlic, parsley, or shallots in addition to the three trinity ingredients. The addition of garlic to the holy trinity is sometimes referred to as adding "the pope."

The holy trinity is the Cajun and Louisiana Creole variant of mirepoix;  traditional mirepoix is two parts onions, one part carrots, and one part celery, whereas the holy trinity is typically one or two parts onions, one part green bell pepper, and one part celery. It is also an evolution of the Spanish sofrito, which contains onion, garlic, bell peppers, and tomatoes.

Origin of the name
The name is an allusion to the Christian doctrine of the Trinity.

The term is first attested in 1981 and was probably popularized by Paul Prudhomme.

See also
 Mirepoix
 Soffritto
 Epis

References

Cajun cuisine
Food ingredients